The R304 is a Regional Route in South Africa that connects Stellenbosch with Atlantis.

Its north-western origin is a junction with the R307 at Atlantis. The NNW/SSE R307 becomes the R304, and the R307 continues as the south-westerly offshoot. After 12 kilometres, the road reaches a t-junction with an easterly route. The R304 is signed as this route, with the straight road signed as Cape Town's M19 thereafter. The now easterly R304 crosses the N7 to pass through the village of Philadelphia.  It continues east to meet the R302. It is co-signed briefly heading north. After leaving the R302, the route heads south-east. It crosses the R312 and the N1. It next meets the R101 at a staggered junction. The route ends in Stellenbosch at the R44.

External links
 Routes Travel Info

References

Regional Routes in the Western Cape